The Battle of Victory (Maarakat an-Nasr), also known as "Tahrir Sahl al-Ghab" was an operations room created by Syrian rebel factions in April 2015, with the goal of capturing the city of Jisr al-Shughur and the surrounding areas in northwestern Syria, from the control of Syrian government forces. The operations room was modelled on the Army of Conquest, which captured Idlib city, and features many of the same groups.

See also
 List of armed groups in the Syrian Civil War
 2015 Jisr al-Shughur offensive
 2015 Idlib offensive

References

External links
 

Anti-government factions of the Syrian civil war
Operations rooms of the Syrian civil war